Dark hunter may refer to:

 Austrogomphus bifurcatus, a species of dragonfly, native to northern Australia
 Dark-Hunter, a paranormal romance novel series by Sherrilyn Kenyon
 Dark-Hunter Universe, a fictional world in which multiple interlocking series by Sherrilyn Kenyon come together, see The Dark-Hunter, Dream-Hunter, Were-Hunter and Hellchaser Universe

Animal common name disambiguation pages